Mangalagiri Tadepalli Municipal Corporation is the civic body that governs Mangalagiri and Tadepalle city's and villages in the corresponding mandals of the Mangalagiri Assembly constituency in Guntur district of Andhra Pradesh. It is classified as important Municipal Corporation in the Capital of Andhra Pradesh. Municipal Corporation mechanism in India was introduced during British Rule with formation of municipal corporation in Madras (Chennai) in 1688, later followed by municipal corporations in Bombay (Mumbai) and Calcutta (Kolkata) by 1762. Mangalagiri Tadepalle Municipal Corporation Municipal Corporation is headed by Mayor of city and governed by Commissioner.

History

Mangalagiri Municipality was formed in 1969. In January 2021, the Municipal Administration and Urban Development Department issued an order notifying the merger of eleven-gram panchayats — Atmakuru, Nutakki, Pedavadlapudi, Ramachandrapuram, Yerrabalem, Kaza, Chinakakani, Nowluru, Chinavadlapudi and Nidamarru of Mangalagiri mandal with Mangalagiri Municipality. Tadepalli Municipality was formed in 2009. In January 2021, the Municipal Administration and Urban Development Department issued an order notifying the merger of ten-gram panchayats — Undavalli, Penumaka, Prathuru, Vaddeswaram, Ippatam, Mellempudi, Chirravuru, Kunchanapalli, Kolanukonda and Gundemeda of Tadepalli mandal with Tadepalli Municipality.In line to develop the Mangalagiri and Tadepalli as model towns, on 23 March 2021, Government of Andhra Pradesh merged Mangalagiri Municipality and Tadepalli Municipality to form Mangalagiri Tadepalli Municipal Corporation..The municipality with the help of Irrigation Department, improves the drinking water, internal roads, supply of electricity and sewerage management..2021 Mangalagiri Tadepalle Municipal Corporation to be developed into model towns at an estimated cost of Rs 1,173.66 crore, and a detailed administrative sanction for the same would be accorded shortly.

Notable people 
 Kallam Anji Reddy, the founder of Dr. Reddy's Laboratories
 Kallam Satish Reddy present Chairman of Dr. Reddy's Laboratories
 Savitri (actress)

Divisions
In March 2021 Tadepalli Municipality, Mangalagiri Municipality, Tadepalli Mandal & Mangalagiri Mandal was merged along with corresponding villages and formed Mangalagiri Tadepalli Municipal Corporation. Mangalagiri Tadepalle Municipal Corporation has a total of 50 election wards.

Tourism
Lakshmi Narasimha Temple is the abode of Lord Vishnu, who manifested himself as Thotadri, is present in Mangalagiri. There are three Narasimha Swamy temples.[28] Undavalli caves, located in Undavalli, are a specimen of Indian rock-cut architecture. The historic caves are located at the top of the hills overlooking the Krishna River, built during the 4th-5th century. Dedicated to Ananta Padmanabha Swamy and Narasimha Swamy, Undavalli Cave Temples are associated with the Vishnukundina kings. Swami Chinna Jeeyar Asramam and Temple town was located in Sitanagaram Tadepalli. Haailand Resorts is the biggest Amusement park on the Guntur-Vijayawada highway. Adventura and Vijayawada Club are recreation places in the corporation.

Notable Places in Corporation
Y. S. Jagan Mohan Reddy Camp Office.
Andhra Pradesh Police Head Quarters.
Prakasam Barrage
Buckingham Canal
Kanaka Durga Varadhi
AIIMS Mangalagiri.
ACA International Cricket Stadium.
Lakshmi Narasimha Temple, Mangalagiri.
Undavalli Caves.
Krishna Canal Junction railway station.
Mangalagiri railway station.
KL University.
NRI Academy of Medical Sciences.
SRM University, Andhra Pradesh.
Amrita Vishwa Vidyapeetham.
Manipal Hospitals India.
Telugu Desam Party Party office for Andhra Pradesh.
YSR Congress Party Party office for Andhra Pradesh.
Jana Sena Party Party office for Andhra Pradesh.

See also
 List of municipalities in Andhra Pradesh

References

Municipal corporations in India
Municipal corporations in Andhra Pradesh
2009 establishments in Andhra Pradesh
Government agencies established in 2009
Urban local bodies in Andhra Pradesh